Kabanga (born 10 October 1984 in DR Congo) is a former Congolese professional footballer who was last contracted to Long An of the V.League 1, a Vietnamese football league.

Career

Orlando Pirates

While playing for TP Mazembe in the 2003 Vodacom Challenge, Kabanga was spotted by the South African football club, the Orlando Pirates and signed for them shortly after. Putting in what was seen as mediocre performances in his four starts and two substitute appearances, he scored his only goal for the Buccaneers in a 1-1 draw with Wits University and was traded to Vietnamese side Long An F.C. following his only season there.

Vietnam

After a spell with Long An F.C. Kabanga was loaned to Quang Nam where he stayed for one season before returning to his previous Vietnamese team. Helping Long An reach second place in the 2008 V.League 1 with a hat-trick in the last round. Kabanga was praised for his unselfishness forming close links with all his teammates. Deployed as an attacking midfielder by the coach, he recorded a brace in the 2006 Vietnamese Super Cup final and an 87th-minute goal in a 1-4 defeat to Seongnam in the 2007 AFC Champions League. Authoring four goals in six rounds in the 2010 V-League. Kabanga was known for his distinct Peacock Dance goal celebration. Because they both were vying for their coach and teammates approval, there was a rivalry between him and Brazilian Antonio that lasted several years. His six-year stint at Long An ended when Simon McMenemy was installed as coach in 2011.

Temporarily changed his name to Le Minh Tshamala due to being naturalized in Vietnam.

Personal life

Learning Vietnamese from another player, Kabanga is able to communicate in English as well and was viewed as the healthiest among his teammates during his time at Long An.

Kabanga now works at the S and A Academy in Vietnam.

Kabanga and his wife live in Long An.

References

Democratic Republic of the Congo footballers
Association football forwards
Orlando Pirates F.C. players
Expatriate soccer players in South Africa
Living people
1984 births
V.League 1 players
Expatriate footballers in Vietnam
South African Premier Division players
Quang Nam FC players
Democratic Republic of the Congo expatriate footballers
Democratic Republic of the Congo expatriate sportspeople in South Africa
Democratic Republic of the Congo expatriate sportspeople in Vietnam